Lisa Rajan (born 1972) is a children's author and former politician. She has written 20 books in the Tara Binns and Dani Binns series published by Collins Publishing, a division of HarperCollins.

Early life 
Rajan lives in South London and studied at Imperial College. She has a BSc in Biotechnology and an MSc in Science Communication.

She has worked in scientific research, scientific publishing, medical copywriting and was a writer for the New Scientist. She was previously an elected member on Southwark Council.

Career

Politician 

Between 2002 and 2016, Rajan was a Liberal Democrat councillor for Southwark London Borough Council, representing the ward of Surrey Docks.

At the 2002 local election, Rajan was elected as a Liberal Democrat councillor for Southwark London Borough Council, representing the ward of Surrey Docks. During her time on the council, she served as a cabinet member for Environment and Transport and then Children's Services and Education.

On 24 May 2021, Rajan was made a Honorary Alderwoman of Southwark recognising her service to the council.

Author 
In 2017 after having a daughter she realised most children's books had male lead characters so she decided to write stories where a girl does the jobs normally associated with men. The Tara Binns and Dani Binns stories feature a different STEM career. Each book is produced in conjunction with real STEM professionals provided by the WISE Campaign.

In 2020 they were a 3-star winner in the STEM category of the Teach Primary awards 2020.

Bibliography

Tara Binns books

Dani Binns books

References

Living people
1972 births
Alumni of Imperial College London
English children's writers
Liberal Democrats (UK) councillors